Acrolophus urcei is a moth of the family Acrolophidae first described by Herbert Druce in 1901. It is found in Panama.

References

Moths described in 1901
urcei